Metriopelma is a monotypic genus of Mexican tarantulas containing the single species, Metriopelma breyeri. This tarantula was named after Albert Breyer (1812–1876), a fellow entomologist. It is native to Mexico in the state of Guanajuato.

Description
Its cephalothorax is brown, a little longer than it is round, with a comparatively narrow forehead. Its sternum is slightly cut on the sides, longer than it is wide, covered with hairs. The chelicerae are reddish, shiny, covered with thick hairs. The abdomen is oval, longer than the cephalothorax, dark brown and hairy. It has sturdy legs, covered with hair, with two small tarsal claws that are reddish and retractile.

See also
 List of Theraphosidae species

References

Monotypic Theraphosidae genera
Spiders of Mexico
Theraphosidae